Melissa Mazzotta (born 21 June 1972) is a former professional tennis player from Venezuela.

Biography
Mazzotta is originally from Caracas but is based in Florida. She was a two-time All-American collegiate tennis player at the University of Miami. 

As a professional player, she reached a top singles ranking of 182 in the world. She featured in the qualifying draws of all four grand slam tournaments. Her WTA Tour career included a win over Rachel McQuillan in Los Angeles in 1994 and she was a doubles runner-up at Bogota in 1998.

She appeared in a total of six Fed Cup ties for her native Venezuela, two in 1991 and four in 1996.

Mazzotta lives in Miami, where she operates a preschool.

WTA Tour finals

Doubles (0-1)

ITF finals

Singles (1–3)

Doubles (1-1)

References

External links
 
 
 

1972 births
Living people
Venezuelan female tennis players
Miami Hurricanes women's tennis players
Venezuelan emigrants to the United States
Tennis players from Caracas
American female tennis players
Tennis players at the 1991 Pan American Games
Pan American Games competitors for Venezuela
20th-century Venezuelan women
21st-century Venezuelan women